Canadian singer and songwriter Shawn Mendes has released four studio albums, two live albums, two reissues, three extended plays, 20 music videos, twenty singles (including two as a featured artist), and nine promotional singles. He has sold over 20 million albums and 175 million singles worldwide. According to RIAA, Mendes has sold 26.5 million digital singles and 4 million certified albums in the US.

Mendes released his first single "Life of the Party" in June 2014, which debuted in the top 25 of the US Billboard Hot 100, making him the youngest artist to debut in the top 25 of the Hot 100 with their debut song. He followed this with an extended play in July 2014, The Shawn Mendes EP, which debuted at number five on Billboard.

His debut studio album, Handwritten (2015), debuted at number one on the Billboard 200 with 119,000 equivalent album units, selling 106,000 copies in its first week. "Something Big" was released as the second single from the album on November 7, 2014, eventually peaking at number 80. The third single from the album, "Stitches", became an international hit, peaking at number one in the UK, number four on the US Billboard Hot 100, number one on Billboard Adult Top 40, and number one on Billboard Adult Contemporary, becoming his first top entry on the UK Singles Chart and his first top 10 in the US. In November 2015, Mendes and Camila Cabello who was at the time a member of the group Fifth Harmony, released their collaborative song "I Know What You Did Last Summer". The song was included on the Revisited reissue of Handwritten.

Mendes released his second studio album Illuminate in 2016, which also debuted at number one on the US Billboard 200 chart with 145,000 equivalent album units, selling 121,000 copies in its first week. His lead single "Treat You Better" peaked at number six on Hot 100, the second single "Mercy" peaked at number 15, and the third single "There's Nothing Holdin' Me Back" peaked at number six. The three singles reached number one on both Adult Top 40 and Adult Contemporary airplay charts, making Mendes the first artist to have three number one singles in the latter chart before turning 20 years old.

In March 2018, Mendes released "In My Blood" as the lead single from his self-titled third album. It peaked at number eleven on the Hot 100 and number one on the Adult Top 40, making Mendes the first artist to have four singles to top the latter chart before turning 20 years old. His second single "Lost in Japan" was released the next day. He released "Youth", "Where Were You in the Morning?", and "Nervous" as singles in May. The same month, he released his self-titled third studio album which debuted at number one in the United States, Canada, Australia, and several European music charts. In 2019, Mendes released his second collaboration with Cabello, "Señorita", which topped the Billboard Hot 100. In December 2020, Mendes became the youngest male artist ever to top the Billboard 200 with four studio albums, with the release of Wonder (2020).

All of his studio albums have debuted at number one in Canada and the United States. Billboard listed him as the 34th Top Artist of the 2010s and placed two entries on their list of Billboard 200 Albums of the 2010s: Illuminate (No. 182) and Shawn Mendes (No. 195). Mendes also has five singles that have sold over a million units in the UK: "Stitches" (2.2 million), "Señorita" (1.73 million), "Treat You Better" (1.62 million), "There's Nothing Holdin' Me Back" (1.6 million) and "Mercy" (1.1 million).

Albums

Studio albums

Reissues

Live albums

Extended plays

Singles

As lead artist

As featured artist

Promotional singles

Other charted and certified songs

Guest appearances

Music videos

Songwriting credits

Notes

References

Discographies of Canadian artists
Pop music discographies
Discography